José Antonio Alonso Suárez (28 March 1960 – 2 February 2017) was a Spanish Socialist Workers' Party (PSOE) politician, cabinet minister and judge. He was born in León.

A jurist (judge since 1985 after graduating from the University of Leon, magistrate 1989 and criminal court judge with the provincial court in Madrid) and academic at the Law Faculty of the University of Leon before his political career, Alonso was elected to the Spanish Congress as a member of the Spanish Socialist Workers' Party in 2004, representing León Province and was re-elected in 2008. He later served as spokesman for the PSOE Parliamentary Group.

From 18 April 2004 to 7 April 2006 he was the Minister of the Interior in the government of José Luis Rodríguez Zapatero. Described by his ministerial colleagues as a man "driven by his strong ideological beliefs and professionalism", Zapatero is said to have chosen Alonso on the grounds that the latter would fight terrorism without compromising human rights. Alonso served as the Minister of Defense until 11 April 2008. Prior to his election he had been a critic of the People's Party's support for George W. Bush and their alleged politicisation of judicial bodies.

Alonso died from lung cancer in Madrid on 2 February 2017 at the age of 56.

References

External links

Biography at Spanish Congress site

|-

1960 births
2017 deaths
People from León, Spain
Spanish Socialist Workers' Party politicians
Members of the 8th Congress of Deputies (Spain)
Members of the 9th Congress of Deputies (Spain)
Government ministers of Spain
Defence ministers of Spain
Deaths from lung cancer in Spain
20th-century Spanish judges
Interior ministers of Spain
21st-century Spanish judges